The grand prix Gobert is one of the prizes of the French Academy. It has been awarded every year in the field  of History since 1834.

It was instituted by the Foundation created by the estate of Baron Gobert Napoleon (1807–1833), son of general Jacques-Nicolas Gobert, and is intended to reward "the most eloquent piece of history of France, or the one whose merits will approach it the most".

Laureates

See also

 List of history awards

Notes

References

External links 
 2016 Edition on Livres hebdo

Gobert
Gobert
Awards established in 1834